Rida Quli is a Turkic-derived Muslim male given name meaning 'slave of Ali ar-Rida'.  It is built from quli. It is equivalent to Arabic-derived Abd ar-Rida or Persian-derived Gholamreza.

People
Reza-Qoli Khan Hedayat
Reza Qoli Mirza Afshar
Mirza Rida Quli Shari'at-Sanglaji

See also
 Rzaguliyev